Vaughan Oliver (12 September 1957 – 29 December 2019) was a British graphic designer based in Epsom, Surrey. Oliver was best known for his work with graphic design studios 23 Envelope and v23. Both studios maintained a close relationship with record label 4AD between 1982 and 1998 and gave distinct visual identities for the 4AD releases by many bands, including Mojave 3, Lush, Cocteau Twins, The Breeders, This Mortal Coil, Pale Saints, Pixies, and Throwing Muses. Oliver also designed record sleeves for such artists as David Sylvian, The Golden Palominos, and Bush.

A book collecting his work, Vaughan Oliver: Archive, was published in 2018.

Career 
Oliver was born in Sedgefield, County Durham on 12 September 1957. He developed an interest in graphic design through his love of music, in particular the work of Roger Dean. He said in 2014 "There was no real culture, my parents were not really interested in anything unusual – everything I was getting was through record sleeves. It was a democratic way of discovering art." It was not until he studied graphic design at Newcastle upon Tyne Polytechnic that he took the subject seriously. Through his studies his interests broadened to include inspiration from the work of Salvador Dalí, Surrealism and Pop artists such as Robert Rauschenberg and Andy Warhol.   After graduating in 1979, Oliver went to London hoping to find a designing job with a large design group. He soon found out that he was not made for working with big corporations or designing for the commercial world. He subsequently met the owner of the record label 4AD, Ivo Watts Russell. This encounter led to a thirty-year partnership between Vaughan Oliver and 4AD.

23 Envelope consisted of Oliver (graphic design and typography) and Nigel Grierson (photography). Together, they created the artwork for almost all 4AD releases until 1987. Grierson left 23 Envelope in 1988. At that time, Oliver continued to work for 4AD under the studio name v23, collaborating with Simon Larbalestier, Marc Atkins and others.

In February 1990, Oliver was asked to bring together the work he had done so far for 4AD to be shown for the first time in an art gallery, the Espace Graslin in Nantes, France. The exhibition gathered so much media exposure throughout Europe that it subsequently moved to the Parc de la Villette in Paris. An illustrated catalogue titled Exhibition/Exposition was published to coincide with both Nantes and Paris exhibitions.

In 1994, many of those who had collaborated with Oliver over the previous decade contributed to an illustrated catalogue for the retrospective exhibition of his work held at the Pacific Design Center in Los Angeles, This Rimy River. Recollections of the v23 design experience were provided by individuals such as design writer Rick Poynor, and art critic Ian McKay who frames Oliver's work in a fine art context.

In 2000 a major monograph Vaughan Oliver: Visceral Pleasures by Rick Poyner was published by Booth-Clibborn Editions.

In 2005, to mark 25 years of 4AD records, Oliver produced a limited-edition publication of his poster designs, with a second-edition published to coincide with a solo exhibition of his posters staged at the Stanley Picker Gallery (Kingston University, London, UK) in 2007.

In 2011, Oliver was awarded an honorary Master of Arts from the University for the Creative Arts, where he taught on the Epsom campus as a visiting professor. Two books of work were published.

4AD 
Oliver's album art helped to shape the aesthetic of 4AD, a cult indie record label that was prominent from the 1980s well into the 1990s. The mysterious qualities in his album art were inspired by surrealist painter Salvador Dalí, whom Oliver admired during his college years. Oliver created album artwork for a number of 4AD bands, including Pixies, Cocteau Twins, The Breeders and This Mortal Coil. Although Oliver worked exclusively with 4AD, he would occasionally work with non-music related clients. He had an influence on the post pop-punk music industry, inspiring hundreds of artists to be different, mysterious and explorative. During the early years of 4AD, Oliver was credited with giving the bands and the label an identity through his visual language, despite their adherence to different genres.

Pixies 
Oliver produced the artwork for the Pixies' entire discography during his lifetime, including the albums Come On Pilgrim (1987), Surfer Rosa (1988), Doolittle (1989), Bossanova (1990), Trompe Le Monde (1991), Indie Cindy (2014), Head Carrier (2016) and Beneath the Eyrie (2019), as well as numerous singles and EPs. In 2009, Oliver designed the Pixies' Minotaur, a 26-pound box set consisting of the band's first five albums, a 96-page fine art book and a 52-page photo book. Oliver stated that, with each Pixies release, he had looked to achieve "a sense of continuity" within the catalog but also employ a "fresh approach", and that his ethos "was always about building individual identities for bands."

Personal life 
Among Oliver's other interests was football. Oliver was a qualified FA coach, and he was a keen supporter of Sunderland. He designed the sleeve of their 1992 FA Cup single and had been approached by the club to redesign their crest.

Oliver died on 29 December 2019 at the age of 62.

Publications
Vaughan Oliver: Archive (Unit Editions, 2018). Edited by Tony Brook and Adrian Shaughnessy. . Two volumes. Edition of 900 copies. Reprinted as a single volume edition in 2020.

Album art discography

 Modern English – Mesh & Lace (1981)
 Modern English – After the Snow (1982)
 Cocteau Twins – Head Over Heels (1983)
 This Mortal Coil – It'll End in Tears (1984)
 Cocteau Twins – Treasure (1984)
 Clan of Xymox – Clan of Xymox (1985)
 Colourbox – Colourbox (1985)
 This Mortal Coil – Filigree & Shadow (1986)
 Cocteau Twins – Victorialand (1986)
 Pixies – Come on Pilgrim (1987)
 David Sylvian – Secrets of the Beehive (1987)
 Pieter Nooten and Michael Brook – Sleeps with the Fishes (1987)
 Pixies – Surfer Rosa (1988)
 Throwing Muses – House Tornado (1988)
 Ultra Vivid Scene – Ultra Vivid Scene (1988)
 Pixies – Doolittle (1989)
 Xymox – Twist of Shadows (1989)
 Lush – Scar (1989)
 Pale Saints – The Comforts of Madness (1990)
 The Breeders – Pod (1990)
 Lush – Mad Love (1990)
 Lush – Sweetness and Light (1990)
 Ultra Vivid Scene – Joy 1967–1990 (1990)
 His Name Is Alive – Livonia (1990)
 Pixies – Bossanova (1990)
 The Psychedelic Furs – World Outside (1991)
 This Mortal Coil – Blood (1991)
 Pixies – Trompe le Monde (1991)
 Lush – Black Spring (1991)
 Lush – Spooky (1992)
 Ultra Vivid Scene – Rev (1992)
 The Breeders – Safari (1992)
 Pale Saints – In Ribbons (1992)
 Red House Painters – Down Colorful Hill (1992)
 The Breeders – Last Splash (1993)
 Kirsty MacColl – Titanic Days (1993)
 David Sylvian and Robert Fripp – The First Day (1993)
 His Name Is Alive – Mouth by Mouth (1993)
 Lush – Split (1993)
 Lisa Germano – Happiness (1993)
 Frank Black – Frank Black (1993)
 Kristin Hersh – Hips and Makers (1994)
 Kristin Hersh – Strings (1994)
 Throwing Muses – University (1995)
 Mojave 3 – Ask Me Tomorrow (1995)
 Bush – Razorblade Suitcase (1996)
 His Name Is Alive – Stars on E.S.P. (1996)
 Kristin Hersh – Strange Angels (1998)
 His Name Is Alive – Ft. Lake (1998)
 His Name Is Alive – Someday My Blues Will Cover the Earth (2001)
 The Breeders – Title TK (2002)
 The Mountain Goats – Tallahassee (2002)
 Throwing Muses – Throwing Muses (2003)
 Kristin Hersh – The Grotto (2003)
 The Mountain Goats – The Sunset Tree (2005)
 Scott Walker – The Drift (2006)
 The Mountain Goats – Get Lonely (2006)
 TV on the Radio – Return to Cookie Mountain (2006)
 Jóhann Jóhannsson – IBM 1401, A User's Manual (2006)
 Emma Pollock – Watch the Fireworks (2007)
 M. Ward – To Go Home (2007)
 Scott Walker – And Who Shall Go to the Ball? And What Shall Go to the Ball? (2007)
 The Breeders – Mountain Battles (2008)
 Jóhann Jóhannsson – Fordlandia (2008)
 The Mountain Goats – Heretic Pride (2008)
 The Mountain Goats – The Life of the World to Come (2009)
 The Breeders – Fate to Fatal (2009)
 Modern English – Soundtrack (2010)
 David Lynch – Crazy Clown Time (2011)
 I Break Horses – Hearts (2011)
 Asobi Seksu – Fluorescence (2011)
 Pixies – Indie Cindy (2014)
 Pixies – Head Carrier (2016)
 Pixies – Beneath the Eyrie (2019)

References 

1957 births
2019 deaths
English graphic designers
Artists from Newcastle upon Tyne
4AD